In relational databases, the information schema is an ANSI-standard set of read-only views that provide information about all of the tables, views, columns, and procedures in a database. It can be used as a source of the information that some databases make available through non-standard commands, such as:

 the SHOW command of MySQL
 the DESCRIBE command of Oracle's SQL*Plus
 the \d command in psql (PostgreSQL's default command-line program).

  => SELECT count(table_name) FROM information_schema.tables;
   count 
  -------
      99
  (1 row)
  => SELECT column_name, data_type, column_default, is_nullable
        FROM information_schema.columns WHERE table_name='alpha';
   column_name | data_type | column_default | is_nullable 
  -------------+-----------+----------------+-------------
   foo         | integer   |                | YES
   bar         | character |                | YES
  (2 rows)
  => SELECT * FROM information_schema.information_schema_catalog_name;
   catalog_name 
  --------------
   johnd
  (1 row)

Implementation 
As a notable exception among major database systems, Oracle does not  implement the information schema. An open-source project exists to address this.

RDBMSs that support information_schema include:

 Amazon Redshift
 Apache Hive
 Microsoft SQL Server
 Snowflake
 MySQL
 PostgreSQL
 H2 Database
 HSQLDB
 InterSystems Caché
 MariaDB
 SingleStore (formerly MemSQL)
 Mimer SQL
 Trino
 Presto

RDBMSs that do not support information_schema include:

 Apache Derby
 Apache Ignite
 Firebird
 Microsoft Access
 IBM Informix
 Ingres
 IBM Db2
 MonetDB
 Oracle Database
 SAP HANA
 SQLite
 Sybase ASE
 Sybase SQL Anywhere
 Teradata
 Vertica

See also 
 Oracle metadata

External links 
 Information schema in H2 Database
 Information schema in MySQL 8.0
 Information schema in PostgreSQL (current version)
 Information schema in SQLite
 Information schema in Microsoft SQL Server 2014
 Information schema in Microsoft SQL Server Compact 4.0
 Oracle Information Schema project on sourceforge
 Information Schema in MariaDB

References 

Databases
Computer standards
American National Standards Institute standards